Monarch is an unincorporated community in Sheridan County, Wyoming, United States. It was founded in 1903 as one of many coal company towns in the area. It was all but abandoned in 1953. Monarch is 3,650 feet (1,113 m) above sea level. Monarch area code (307).

References

Unincorporated communities in Wyoming
Unincorporated communities in Sheridan County, Wyoming